The Irizar PB is a coach body manufactured by the Irizar Group from 2001 to 2015. It was built upon of the wide range of chassis. It was designed by Arup Design Research in the UK. Its revolutionary styling and features led to the variant with a Scania chassis being named European Coach of the Year 2004.

The PB body is available in 13 different combinations, each suited to particular chassis. Lengths range from 12 m to 15 m for tri-axle variants. The body is available in two heights: 3.5 m and 3.7 m.

Subsequently, the PB which being replaced by the Irizar i8 and the Irizar i6.

Chassis
Known chassis which the Irizar PB body has been built upon:

MAN 18.xxx HOCL/24.xxx HOCLN
Scania K114EB/K124EB/K114IB
Scania K EB
Iveco EuroRider 397E
Volvo B12
Volvo B12B
Volvo B13R
Volvo B11R
Mercedes-Benz OC 500 RF (Spain)
Mercedes-Benz O 500 series (in Brazil)
Volksbus 18.330 OT (in Latin America)

References

External links

Product description in Irizar website
Document about the design process of the Irizar PB at the Arup site

Coaches (bus)
Buses of Spain
Vehicles introduced in 2001